Marienville is an unincorporated community and census-designated place (CDP) in Jenks Township, Forest County, Pennsylvania, United States. Other names for the community have included "Marion" and "Marionville". Marienville is a major point on a well-known ATV trail. According to the 2010 census the population of Marienville was 3,137.

Marienville is the location of the SCI Forest state penitentiary.

Geography
The community is in southeastern Forest County near the center of Jenks Township. Pennsylvania Route 66 is the main street, leading northeast  to U.S. Route 6 at Kane and southwest  to Interstate 80 near Clarion. Pennsylvania Route 899 leads south from Marienville  to Clarington.

Demographics

References 

Census-designated places in Forest County, Pennsylvania